Sphingobacterium faecium is a bacterium from the genus of Sphingobacterium which has been isolated from the feces of the cattle Bos sprunigenius taurus.

References

External links
Type strain of Sphingobacterium faecium at BacDive -  the Bacterial Diversity Metadatabase	

Sphingobacteriia
Bacteria described in 1993